Straumen is the administrative centre of the municipality of Inderøy in Trøndelag county, Norway. It is located along the Trondheimsfjord at the northeastern side of the Inderøya peninsula, next to the Børgin fjord. The village has a slaughterhouse, a folk high school, and a museum. The Sakshaug Church and the historic Old Sakshaug Church lie just west of Straumen.

Media gallery

References

Villages in Trøndelag
Inderøy